Karoline Hausted is a Danish pianist and songwriter. In 2003 she was featured on Danish National Radio's  CD Compilation. Also, at this time, she released the album "Down to The River" with the band Salley Gardens In 2008, Karoline released her solo album "Double Silence" on her own label; Blush Music.

Discography
Double Silence (2009)
Drawings (2010)
Jeg Tror Jeg Drømmer (2012)
Echoes (2013)

References

External links 
 Blush Music Records
 Karoline Hausted Myspace

Danish pianists
Danish women pianists
Living people
Year of birth missing (living people)
21st-century pianists
21st-century women pianists